Piya Rangrezz is an Indian television series that premiered on Life OK from 27 April 2015 to 26 May 2016. The series was produced by Sphere Origins and was set in Uttar Pradesh. It starred Gaurav S Bajaj, Kirtida Mistry, Narayani Shastri and Kanwar Dhillon.

Plot 
Sher Singh, a powerful young man, is madly in love with a shy and soft-spoken Shraddha. He will do anything to win her love even if it means fighting his mother with whom he shares a strong bond.

Cast

Main
 Narayani Shastri as Bhanwari Devi Singh: Sher's mother; Shamsher and Arjun's grandmother
 Gaurav S Bajaj as Thakur Sher Singh: Shraddha's husband; Shamsher and Arjun's father
 as Thakur Shamsher Singh: Sher and Shraddha's son; Arjun's brother; Aaradhya's husband
 Kirtida Mistry as Shraddha Singh: Sher's wife; Shamsher and Arjun's mother
 Kanwar Dhillon as Arjun Singh: Sher and Shraddha's son; Shamsher's brother
 Gulki Joshi / Sreejita De as Dr. Aaradhya Singh: Shamsher's wife

Recurring
 Shivshakti Sachdev as Chanda: Sher's lover
 Neha Bagga as Moonmoon Singh
 Afzaal Khan as Munna Singh
 Parv Kaila as Veer Singh
 Sahil Phull as Virat
 Rujut Dahiya as Vikas Singh 
 Prabhjeet Kaur as Sunheri Singh
 Rehan Sayed as Sumer Singh
Shalu Shreya as Gajra
 Naman Shaw as Aditya Pratap Singh
 Sanjay Batra as Politician
 Vibha Chibber / Niyati Joshi as Mrs. Singh (Dadi)
 Sakib Hossain as Thakur Veerendra Pratap
 Nishikant Dixit as Mukund Mishra

References

2015 Indian television series debuts
2016 Indian television series endings
Hindi-language television shows
Life OK original programming
Television shows set in Uttar Pradesh